Shebin Benson (born 27 November 1995) is an Indian actor who works predominantly in Malayalam films.

Shebin made his debut in Aashiq Abu movie Idukki Gold in 2013,  Later he appeared in Mammootty starrer Varsham. His first movie as a male lead was Kaly along with a bunch of youngsters.

Early life
Shebin Benson was born into a Christian Marthoma family in Nilambur as the elder son of Chandy Benson and Sherly Benson. He has a younger brother, Nebish Benson who is also an actor in the Malayalam cinema. Shebin completed his secondary level education at Fatimagiri High School, Nilambur and Marthoma Higher Secondary School, Nilambur. He is a graduate in B.Sc. Visual Communication from The SRM Institute of Science and Technology, Chennai, Tamil Nadu.

Career
Shebin applied for the audition of Idukki Gold and was included in the 25 shortlisted actors and got his debut role to play the younger version of Maniyanpilla Raju. Shebin appeared as Ameer alongside Mammootty, Mamta Mohandas and Asha Sarath in the Ranjith Sankar movie Varsham which gained him better recognition among the Malayali audience. Shebin played the role of teenaged Fahadh Faasil in Amal Neerad's Iyobinte Pusthakam along with his brother Nebish Benson which released on 7 November 2014.Later in Santhosh Viswanath's Chirakodinja Kinavukal, Shebin portrayed the childhood of Thayyalkaran played by Kunchacko Boban. He appeared in a music video "Maya" from the band album Blank Planet in 2015. He played the younger Dawood in Inspector Dawood Ibrahim directed by Sajid Yahiya in which Jayasurya played the lead. Shebin played a lead role in Don Max's debut directorial movie 10 Kalpanakal. Shebin was later seen with Asif Ali (actor) in Kaattu. He debuted as a male lead in Kaly along with a group of young actors. Thereafter he was seen as one of the lead actors in Mr. & Ms. Rowdy directed by Jeethu Joseph along with Kalidas Jayaram and Aparna Balamurali and in Paviyettante Madhurachooral along with Sreenivasan and Lena. His debut as an individual hero was in Onnonnara pranayakadha which was directed by Shibu Balan and had Zaya David, Indy Palissery, Vinay Forrt, Sudheer Karamana, Surabhi Lakshmi in lead roles. He also played a key role in Aashiq Abu directed multistarred movie virus (2019 film). His role as "Yahiya" in the movie was widely appreciated. His character as Leen Zacaria in his latest release Evidey directed by KK Rajeev gained him wider recognition among Malayalam audiences and received wide appreciation. He played one of the lead roles along with Manoj K Jayan and Asha Sharath.His upcoming movies are "2 stroke" directed by Roshni Dinaker in which he plays one of the leads along with Sreenath Bhasi and Amith Chakalakkal and Bheeshma Parvam, directed by Amal Neerad along with Mammootty, Soubin Shahir and Sreenath Bhasi.

Filmography

References

External links
 
 
 

1995 births
Living people
Indian male film actors
Male actors in Malayalam cinema